Marcin Wojciech Libicki (born 2 February 1939 in Poznań) is a Polish politician, former member of the Polish parliament (Sejm), elected for the Poznań constituency. He is one of the leaders of the Law and Justice party.

On 13 June 2004, he was elected as a Member of the European Parliament (MEP), and when the Parliament convened he was elected Chair of its Committee on Petitions.

He is a member of the Sovereign Military Order of Malta, also the alumnus of Adam Mickiewicz High School in Poznań. He is the father of Jan Filip Libicki, a member of Sejm.

See also
2004 European Parliament election in Poland

External links 
Marcin Libicki's personal page
Marcin Libicki Sejm page

1939 births
Living people
Politicians from Poznań
Members of the Polish Sejm 1991–1993
Members of the Polish Sejm 1997–2001
Members of the Polish Sejm 2001–2005
Law and Justice MEPs
MEPs for Poland 2004
MEPs for Poland 2004–2009